Kuntur Sinqa (Quechua kuntur condor, sinqa nose, "condor nose", also spelled Cóndorsencca) is a mountain in the Andes of Peru which reaches a height of approximately . It lies in the Junín Region, Tarma Province, Tarma District.

References 

Mountains of Peru
Mountains of Junín Region